Pick of Destiny may refer to:

 Tenacious D in The Pick of Destiny, a comedy/rock musical set in the 1990s, starring Tenacious D
 The Pick of Destiny, album by the American hard rock band Tenacious D, serving as the soundtrack of the movie "Tenacious D in The Pick of Destiny"
 POD (song), a song from the album "The Pick of Destiny"